Jowzeqan (also Romanized as Jowzeqān and Jowzqān) is a village in Kuhsangi Rural District, Miyan Velayat District, Taybad County, Razavi Khorasan Province, Iran. At the 2006 census, its population was 1,833, in 423 families.

References 

Populated places in Taybad County